Bedan Karoki Muchiri (born 21 August 1990) is a Kenyan professional long distance runner who competes in track, cross country and road running disciplines. He represented Kenya at the 2012 and 2016 Summer Olympics.

He was a silver medallist at the 2015 IAAF World Cross Country Championships and the 2016 IAAF World Half Marathon Championships, and also in the 10,000 m at the 2011 All-Africa Games. His half marathon best of 58:42 minutes ranks him in the all-time top ten for the distance.

Career
Bedan Karoki Muchiri was born in Nyandarua. Muchiri attended Muthiga and Kagondo primary schools in Kenya and joined the Mt.Kenya Talents Development Centre, before going on to study in Japan. He graduated from high school there and attained a high level of proficiency in Japanese. Karoki spent much of his early career running on the Japanese racing circuit, including wins at the Chiba International Cross Country three years in a row, from 2009 to 2011. He also won the Fukuoka International Cross Country in 2011.

He had his first international call-up for Kenya and won a silver medal in the 10,000 m at the 2011 All-Africa Games in Maputo, despite losing the trials and eventually gaining selection as a wildcard entry.

He won his place on the Kenyan Olympic team by finishing third behind Wilson Kiprop and Moses Masai at the Kenyan Olympic Trials in Eugene, Oregon, which were held during the Prefontaine Classic. He finished fifth in the 10,000 metres at the 2012 Olympics in a time of 27:32.94, the highest finishing Kenyan in the race.

In 2013, he won the Kenyan trials then placed sixth in the 10,000 meters at the 2013 World Championships in Athletics.

In 2014, he competed in his first American road race, winning the Beach to Beacon 10K in 27:36.  Later he won the Rock 'n' Roll Philadelphia Half Marathon in 59:23.

Karoki placed second at the 2015 IAAF World Cross Country Championships behind countryman Geoffrey Kipsang after leading for much of the race. He represented Kenya in the 10,000 m at the 2015 World Championships in Athletics and narrowly missed out on a medal in fourth place. Medals came at the 2016 IAAF World Half Marathon Championships, where he was runner-up to compatriot Geoffrey Kipsang Kamworor and shared in the team title.

He is the Ambassador for The Mt. Kenya Talents Development Centre.

In 2017 Muchiri competed in the 2017 London Marathon where he finished in a time of 2:07:41 behind Ethiopian Kenenisa Bekele and Kenyan counterpart Daniel Wanjiru.

International competitions

National titles
Kenyan Cross Country Championships
12 km: 2012, 2014, 2015
Kenyan World Championships Trials
10,000 metres: 2013
Japan Championships in Athletics
5000 metres: 2009, 2011
Japanese Corporate Championships
5000 metres: 2012

Circuit wins
Copenhagen Half Marathon: 2015
Philadelphia Half Marathon: 2014
Gifu Seiryu Half Marathon: 2014
Lisbon Half Marathon: 2014
Beach to Beacon 10K: 2014
World's Best 10K: 2014, 2016
Discovery Kenya Cross Country: 2016
Fukuoka International Cross Country: 2011
Chiba International Cross Country: 2009, 2010, 2011
Ras Al Khaimah Half Marathon: 2017, 2018
Buenos Aires Half Marathon: 2019

Personal bests
1500 metres – 3:42.1 (2016)
3000 metres – 7:37.68 (2013)
5000 metres – 13:15.25 (2014)
10,000 metres – 26:52.12 (2017)
10K run – 27:37 (2014)
Half marathon – 58:42 (2018)
Marathon – 02:05:53 (2019)

Info from All Athletics

References

External links

1990 births
Living people
Kenyan male long-distance runners
Olympic athletes of Kenya
Athletes (track and field) at the 2012 Summer Olympics
Athletes (track and field) at the 2016 Summer Olympics
World Athletics Championships athletes for Kenya
African Games silver medalists for Kenya
African Games medalists in athletics (track and field)
Kenyan male cross country runners
Athletes (track and field) at the 2011 All-Africa Games
20th-century Kenyan people
21st-century Kenyan people